Huberantha cerasoides (synonym Polyalthia cerasoides) is a species of trees in the family Annonaceae and tribe Miliuseae. It is the type species of the relatively new genus Huberantha.

It has been recorded from Hainan island in China, Indo-China, India, and Sri Lanka.

Description
This is a small tree species with yellow flowers and single-seeded fruit, in clusters (see illustrations).

Vernacular names
This species is known as "පට්ට උල් කෙන්ද - patta ul kenda" in Sinhala Language and quần đầu trái tròn in Vietnamese.

References

External links

 http://www.biotik.org/laos/species/p/polce/polce_en.html
 http://www.efloras.org/florataxon.aspx?flora_id=600&taxon_id=200008574
 http://indiabiodiversity.org/species/show/249383

cerasoides
Flora of tropical Asia
cerasoides